Nelson F. Beckwith (April 18, 1813 – January 6, 1873) was an American politician and businessman who served as a member of the Wisconsin State Assembly.

Biography
Beckwith was born on April 18, 1813, in Rushford, New York. He resided in Omro, Wisconsin, where he constructed mills. Beckwith also briefly lived in Berlin, Wisconsin. There, two properties that belonged to him, now known as the Beckwith House Hotel and the Nelson F. Beckwith House, are listed on the National Register of Historic Places.

Beckwith was a member of the Wisconsin State Assembly during the 1872 session. His seat was contested in 1872 because of voting irregularities, but was retained. Previously, Beckwith had been an unsuccessful candidate in 1868. He was Democrat.

He died unexpectedly of heart disease in 1873.

References

External links

People from Rushford, New York
People from Omro, Wisconsin
People from Berlin, Wisconsin
Millers
1813 births
1873 deaths
19th-century American politicians
Democratic Party members of the Wisconsin State Assembly